Bartolo may refer to:
Bartolo, California
Bartolo Nardini, Italian grappa company 
Dr. Bartolo, a figure in Rossini's opera The Barber of Seville, and Mozart's The Marriage of Figaro
Bartolo, the highest mountain in the Desert de les Palmes Mountains, close to Castelló, Spain

People with that name
Bartolo (given name)
Bartolo (surname)

See also
Bartholomew
Saint Bartholomew
San Bartolo (disambiguation)